Empis opaca is a species of dance flies, in the fly family Empididae. It is found in most of Europe, except the Balkan Peninsula and the Iberian Peninsula.

References

External links
Fauna Europaea

Empis
Asilomorph flies of Europe
Insects described in 1804